Rusi Framroze Surti ( 25 May 1936 – 13 January 2013) was an Indian cricketer who played in 26 Tests from 1960 to 1969. He was a left-arm medium pace and left-arm spin bowler and a lower-order batsman. Surti was also a popular professional for Haslingden in the Lancashire League in 1959.

After an uneventful Test debut against Pakistan at Bombay, Surti impressed in his second Test match with an innings of 64 at New Delhi. He had been promoted up the order to number 3. India toured the West Indies in 1962 and Surti made 246 runs in the series. In 1967/68 they toured Australia and New Zealand, and after various first-class fixtures and the Tests, he made 967 runs at 37.19 and took 42 wickets. In the Tests, he made 688 runs at an average of 45.50 with 22 wickets. At Auckland, he was dismissed for his highest Test score of 99. He was the first Indian player to score a fifty and take five wickets in the same Test match against Australia.

In the Ranji Trophy, he played for Rajasthan and Gujarat, with his highest score being 246 not out for Rajasthan against Uttar Pradesh in 1959/60. Surti later played for Queensland in the Sheffield Shield, Australia's domestic first-class competition. He became the first and only Indian Test player to play in the Sheffield Shield. When he retired, Surti decided to become an Australian and stayed in Queensland, working as a cricket coach for another 35 years.

In 2013, while on a routine trip to Mumbai, Surti had a stroke and Indian cricket's original braveheart died, aged 76.

References

External links

1936 births
2013 deaths
Gujarat cricketers
Indian cricketers
India Test cricketers
Parsi people
Cricketers from Surat
Queensland cricketers
Rajasthan cricketers
Central Zone cricketers
West Zone cricketers